State Route 72 (SR 72) is a  state highway that runs west-to-east through portions of Clarke, Madison, and Elbert counties in the northeastern part of the U.S. state of Georgia. This route is part of a multi two-state route 72 that begins at Athens, Georgia and ends at Rock Hill, South Carolina. The route connects the Athens area with the South Carolina state line, southwest of Calhoun Falls, South Carolina, via Comer and Elberton.

Route description
SR 72 begins at an intersection with US 29/SR 8 (Old Monroe Road) in the northeastern part of Athens, on the northern edge of Athens Technical College, in Clarke County. It travels to the northeast, crossing into Madison County and passes through the towns of Hull and Colbert, and meets the western terminus of SR 172, just northeast of Colbert. Just before entering and bypassing Comer, the route crosses over the South Fork Broad River. While bypassing the town, it intersects the eastern terminus of SR 22 and the southern terminus of SR 98. SR 72 departs Comer, passing northeast of Watson Mill Bridge State Park, before bypassing Carlton. It heads northeast, crossing over the Broad River into Elbert County. It continues northeast toward Elberton. Just before entering town, it begins a concurrency with SR 17 (Bowman Highway). In town, it intersects SR 77 (Oliver Street). On the southeastern edge of town, SR 17 splits off to the southeast onto Elbert Street, while SR 72 heads east-southeast. It passes through rural areas of the county, and intersects the northern terminus of SR 79 (Lincolnton Highway) right before crossing the South Carolina border. At the South Carolina line, it crosses over Richard B. Russell Lake. There, the roadway continues to the northwest, toward Calhoun Falls, as South Carolina Highway 72.

The entire length of SR 72 is part of the National Highway System, a system of routes determined to be the most important for the nation's economy, mobility, and defense.

Future
GDOT proposed to widen SR 72 into a four-lane road with a green grass median from an intersection of SR 17 in Elberton to the South Carolina state line. The project was made to make the multi-state route 72 into a four-lane highway with some stretch miles of being a divided highway from its western terminus at Athens to an interchange of Interstate 26 (I-26) at Clinton, South Carolina.

Major intersections

See also

References

External links

 Georgia Roads (Routes 61 - 80)

072
Transportation in Athens, Georgia
Transportation in Clarke County, Georgia
Transportation in Madison County, Georgia
Transportation in Elbert County, Georgia